This is a list of post-secondary institutions in the country of Guyana. Schools are listed in alphabetical order and includes non-tertiary, vocational institutions.

Universities and colleges in Guyana include

Public Institutions 
University of Guyana
Cyril Potter College of Education

Private Institutions 
Alexander American University
American International School of Medicine
The Business School Guyana
Georgetown American University
Green Heart Medical University
Lincoln American University
Rajiv Gandhi University of Science and Technology
School of the Nations (Guyana)
Texila American University

Trade schools 
 Guyana Industrial Training Centre
 Government Technical Institute
 Essequibo Technical Institute
 Linden Technical Institute
 Upper Corentyne Technical Institute
 Carnegie School of Home Economics
 New Amsterdam Technical Institute
 Guyana School of Agriculture

See also 

 List of schools in Guyana
 Education in Guyana

References

Universities
 
 
Guyana
Guyana
Universities and colleges in Guyana